Crianlarich railway station is a railway station serving the village of Crianlarich in Scotland. It is located on the West Highland Line, sited  from Craigendoran Junction, near Helensburgh, with Ardlui to the south, and Tyndrum Lower and Upper Tyndrum to the north west, on the routes to Oban and Mallaig respectively, which diverge immediately north of the station. ScotRail, who manage the station, operate most services (along with Caledonian Sleeper).

History 

Crianlarich station opened concurrently with the West Highland Railway on 7 August 1894, doubling the number of railway stations in the village. The lines and station were eventually built by the state under compulsory purchase arrangements sought after the persistent rejection by the landowners the Place family of Loch Dochart House and Skelton Grange, Yorkshire, who even turned down the offer of having all the proceeds from the two station tea-rooms in perpetuity. The Places felt that the project would spoil their shooting grounds; the family sold their house and estate shortly after their defeat and retreated to Yorkshire.

The station was laid out with a crossing loop around an island platform and sidings on both sides. On the east side there was an engine shed and a turntable. Three years after opening, in 1897, a junction and link line down to the Callander and Oban Railway, which passed below the West Highland route, was added. Originally, the junction incorporated a scissors crossover, allowing simultaneous moves through the junction. However until 1931 the link line was only used to exchange goods wagons between the two lines. From 1931 onwards, it was also used for excursion traffic from Glasgow and the surrounding areas to the Oban line.

The station was host to a LNER camping coach from 1937 to 1939.

Since closure of the Callander and Oban Line east of Crianlarich in 1965 due to a landslide that submerged the railway in Glen Ogle, all trains to Oban have been routed up the West Highland Line as far as Crianlarich Upper station. They then join the remaining part of the Oban line by means of the link line, which had formerly been infrequently used.

Crianlarich Lower station closed on 28 September 1965, and on 1 November 1965 the Upper station's name reverted to "Crianlarich".

The late 19th century 13-bay brick engine shed still stands and Historic Scotland have designated it as a category C listed building.

Freight facilities 

The area around the station is forested. The sidings on the west side of the station were used for loading timber until December 2008 when the carriage of Scottish timber by rail ceased in connection with the recession. As of June 2015, there is still no sign of the service being reinstated. Timber trains leaving the sidings at Crianlarich often paused at Arrochar and Tarbet to attach further wagons, the sidings at both stations are now used by the Area Civil Engineer for the storage of materials.

Facilities 
The station is equipped with a tea room, a waiting room, benches, an accessible toilet and bike racks. Access to the platform is via a flight of stairs from a subway that runs underneath the tracks, from two car parks. As there are no facilities to purchase tickets, passengers must buy one in advance, or from the guard on the train.

Passenger volume 

The statistics cover twelve month periods that start in April.

Services
Northbound, Crianlarich is where the combined trains for Oban and Mallaig divide, with each of the services leaving roughly five minutes apart. Southbound, when each train arrives from Oban or Mallaig, it joins with the other and they go down as one train from Crianlarich. 

On weekdays and Saturdays, there are a total of seven southbound ScotRail trains to Glasgow Queen Street. Northbound, there are three trains which divide, with portions to go to Oban and Mallaig, as well as three trains which only go to Oban. On Sundays, there are three services to Oban and two to Mallaig, and there are three trains to Glasgow Queen Street. On Summer Sundays, an extra train from Edinburgh to Oban and back runs, which does not go via Glasgow.

The Caledonian Sleeper runs southbound to London Euston on Sunday and weekday nights, and northbound to Fort William on weekday and Saturday mornings. The Sleeper conveys seats to carry regular passengers as far as Edinburgh.

References

Bibliography

External links

Video footage of Crianlarich station

Railway stations in Stirling (council area)
Former North British Railway stations
Railway stations in Great Britain opened in 1894
Railway stations served by ScotRail
Railway stations served by Caledonian Sleeper
James Miller railway stations
1894 establishments in Scotland